A computer language is a formal language used to communicate with a computer. Types of computer languages include:

 Construction language – all forms of communication by which a human can specify an executable problem solution to a computer
 Command language – a language used to control the tasks of the computer itself, such as starting programs
 Configuration language – a language used to write configuration files
 Programming language – a formal language designed to communicate instructions to a machine, particularly a computer
 Query language – a language used to make queries in databases and information systems
 Transformation language – designed to transform some input text in a certain formal language into a modified output text that meets some specific goal
 Data exchange language – a language that is domain-independent and can be used for data from any kind of discipline; examples: JSON, XML
 Markup language – a grammar for annotating a document in a way that is syntactically distinguishable from the text, such as HTML
 Modeling language – an artificial language used to express information or knowledge, often for use in computer system design
 Architecture description language – used as a language (or a conceptual model) to describe and represent system architectures
 Hardware description language – used to model integrated circuits
 Page description language – describes the appearance of a printed page in a higher level than an actual output bitmap
 Simulation language – a language used to describe simulations
 Specification language – a language used to describe what a system should do
 Style sheet language – a computer language that expresses the presentation of structured documents, such as CSS

See also
 Serialization
 Domain-specific language – a language specialized to a particular application domain
 General-purpose language – a language that is broadly applicable across application domains, and lacks specialized features for a particular domain
 Lists of programming languages
 Natural language processing – the use of computers to process text or speech in human language

External links